Jesús Humberto Martínez de la Cruz (born 31 December 1956) is a Mexican politician affiliated with the Institutional Revolutionary Party. As of 2014 he served as Deputy of the LIX Legislature of the Mexican Congress representing Tamaulipas.

References 

1956 births
Living people
People from Matamoros, Tamaulipas
Institutional Revolutionary Party politicians
Politicians from Tamaulipas
Autonomous University of Nuevo León alumni
21st-century Mexican politicians
Deputies of the LIX Legislature of Mexico
Members of the Chamber of Deputies (Mexico) for Tamaulipas